Mississauga—Erin Mills is a federal electoral district in Ontario. It encompasses a portion of Ontario formerly included in the electoral district of Mississauga—Erindale.

Mississauga—Erin Mills was created by the 2012 federal electoral boundaries redistribution and was legally defined in the 2013 representation order. It came into effect upon the call of the 42nd Canadian federal election, scheduled for 19 October 2015.

Demographics
According to the Canada 2021 Census

Ethnic groups: 30.1% White, 26.8% South Asian, 10.8% Chinese, 10.0% Arab, 6.6% Black, 4.8% Filipino, 1.8% Latin American, 1.5% Southeast Asian, 1.4% West Asian, 1.2% Korean

Languages: 43.0% English, 7.9% Arabic, 7.8% Urdu, 5.1% Mandarin, 2.5% Cantonese, 2.3% Polish, 2.2% Tagalog, 1.8% Spanish, 1.4% Hindi, 1.4% Punjabi, 1.3% Portuguese, 1.2% Tamil

Religions: 45.4% Christian (26.4% Catholic, 3.3% Christian Orthodox, 2.1% Anglican, 1.3% United Church, 1.2% Pentecostal, 11.1% Other), 24.9% Muslim, 7.5% Hindu, 1.8% Sikh, 1.6% Buddhist, 17.8% No religion

Median income: $39,600 (2020)

Average income: $54,550 (2020)

Members of Parliament

This riding has elected the following Members of Parliament:

Election results

References

External links
https://iqrakhalid.liberal.ca/
http://mississaugaerinmillsndp.ca/
https://www.greenparty.ca/en/riding/2013-35060

Ontario federal electoral districts
Politics of Mississauga
2013 establishments in Ontario